The 2016 South Australian National Football League season (officially the SANFL IGA League) was the 137th season of the South Australian National Football League (SANFL) Australian rules football competition.

Two key new rules to be introduced for the 2016 season are:
Interchange rotations to be restricted to a total of fifty per team per game.
A free kick to be awarded against a player who kicks or handpasses the ball if it goes out of bounds without being touched by another player.
Both rules were more aggressive variants of similar rule changes later made in the AFL in 2016: the AFL limited interchanges to ninety per game, and adopted a stricter interpretation of deliberate out of bounds without automatically applying it to all untouched disposals out of bounds.

The season commenced on 24 March and concluded with the Grand Final on 25 September.
 won their 14th premiership and first in 14 years, defeating minor premiers  by 27 points in the Grand Final at Adelaide Oval.

Premiership season

Round 1

Round 2

Round 3

Round 4

Round 5

Round 6

Round 7

Round 8

Round 9

Round 10

Round 11

Round 12

Round 13

Round 14

Round 15

Round 16

Round 17

Round 18

Round 19

Round 20

Round 21

Round 22

Ladder

Finals series

Qualifying and Elimination Finals

Semi-finals

Preliminary final

Grand Final

Awards and premiers

Awards
 The Magarey Medal (awarded to the best and fairest player in the home and away season) was won by Zane Kirkwood of Sturt, who polled 24 votes. It was Kirkwood's second Magarey Medal having previously won in 2014.
 The Ken Farmer Medal (awarded to the leading goalkicker in the home and away season) was won by Brett Eddy of South Adelaide. He kicked 68 goals in the 2016 home and away season.
 The Stanley H. Lewis Memorial Trophy (awarded to the best performing club in the League, Reserves and Under 18 competitions) was won by Woodville West-Torrens, with 2975 points, which was 775 points ahead of second-place South Adelaide. It was the Eagles' 5th trophy having previously won in 1993, 2000, 2013 and 2015.
 The R.O. Shearman Medal (awarded to the player adjudged best by the 10 SANFL club coaches each game) was won by Jared Petrenko of Woodville West-Torrens.
 Woodville-West Torrens were the league minor premiers, finishing top of the ladder at the end of the home and away season with 14 wins and 4 losses. It is the club's 6th minor premiership in the SANFL and their 2nd in succession.

Premiers
  were the League premiers, defeating  by 27 points.
  were the Reserves premiers, defeating  by 20 points.
  were the Under 18 premiers, defeating  by 1 point.

Advertiser SANFL Team of the Year

References

South Australian National Football League seasons
SANFL